Olga Kotlyarova (born 12 April 1976 in Sverdlovsk) is a Russian runner. She used to compete mainly in 400 metres, and has an Olympic bronze medal from 2000 in relay. She is also a world champion (indoor and outdoor) in this event.

In 2005, she concentrated more on the 800 metres distance, managing to set a new personal best and to finish fourth at the World Athletics Final.

In August 2006 she became the European Champion in the 800 metres.

Personal bests
200 metres - 23.35 (1996)
400 metres - 49.77 (2004)
800 metres - 1:57.24 (2006)

International competitions

References

1976 births
Living people
Sportspeople from Yekaterinburg
Russian female sprinters
Olympic female sprinters
Olympic athletes of Russia
Olympic bronze medalists for Russia
Olympic bronze medalists in athletics (track and field)
Athletes (track and field) at the 1996 Summer Olympics
Athletes (track and field) at the 2000 Summer Olympics
Medalists at the 2000 Summer Olympics
Universiade medalists in athletics (track and field)
Universiade silver medalists for Russia
Medalists at the 1997 Summer Universiade
World Athletics Championships athletes for Russia
World Athletics Championships medalists
World Athletics Championships winners
World Athletics Indoor Championships medalists
World Athletics Indoor Championships winners
European Athletics Championships winners
European Athletics Championships medalists
Russian Athletics Championships winners
World Athletics indoor record holders (relay)